The Obukhovsky or Obukhov Bridge (Russian: Обуховский мост) is a bridge  in St. Petersburg, Russia.  It carries Moskovsky Prospekt over the Fontanka River.

It was originally built as a stone bridge in 1785–86 to replace a 1717 wooden bridge, and was named after the builder. It was substantially modified in 1865 and again in 1938–1940.

In literature 

The bridge is mentioned at the end of Nikolai Gogol's short story, "The Overcoat". The main character, Akaky Akakievich —or a certain clerk— is rumored to appear as a ghost near the Kalinkin Bridge, searching for his stolen overcoat, and after the story's denouement is seen walking towards the Obukhov Bridge and vanishing into the darkness of the night.

References

Bridges in Saint Petersburg
Cultural heritage monuments of regional significance in Saint Petersburg